John Henry Altmann (8 December 1916 – 16 April 1983) was an Australian rules footballer who played with Geelong in the Victorian Football League (VFL).

Altmann played three games for Geelong in 1944, while serving in the Royal Australian Air Force during World War II.

Notes

External links 

1916 births
1983 deaths
Australian rules footballers from Victoria (Australia)
Geelong Football Club players
Newtown & Chilwell Football Club players
Royal Australian Air Force personnel of World War II
Royal Australian Air Force airmen